Corrina Sephora Mensoff (born November 4, 1971, in Alstead, New Hampshire) is a visual artist who specializes in metal work, sculpture, painting, installation, and mixed media in Atlanta, Georgia, in the United States. Corrina works with universal and personal themes of loss and transformation, within the context of contemporary society. In Corrina’s most recent bodies of work she is exploring lunar images, cells, and the universe as “a meditation in the making.” In a concurrent body of work she has delved into the physical transformation of guns, altering their molecular structure into flowers and garden tools through hot forging the materials. Her work has led her to community involvement with the conversation of guns in our society.

Education
Mensoff received her BFA in Sculpture and Metalsmithing at the Massachusetts College of Art in Boston in 1995.  She received her MFA in Sculpture at Georgia State University in 2005.

She created a self-guided journeyman's apprenticeship in Atlanta. She founded Phoenix Metalworks, specializing in sculpture, furniture and architectural works. She taught at the University of Georgia in Athens, the Savannah College of Art and Design (SCAD), and Georgia State University.  She has conducted research on architecture and environment in Croatia and Romania. She has won the City of Atlanta Arts for Services Grant three times.

Awards
2019 Small Arts Project Grant, Fulton County Arts & Culture, Fulton County, Georgia
2018 - 2019 Contracts for Arts Services Grant, Mayor’s Office of Cultural Affairs, Atlanta, Georgia 
2018 Hambidge Creative Residency Program, The Hambidge Center, Rabun Gap, Georgia 
2016 Artists in Residence Program, Mendocino Art Center, Mendocino, California 
2015 First Place Award, City of North Charleston Outdoor Sculpture Exhibition & Competition, North Charleston, South Carolina
2014 Contracts for Arts Services Grant, Mayor’s Office of Cultural Affairs, Atlanta, Georgia 
2012 Hambidge Creative Residency Program, The Hambidge Center, Rabun Gap, Georgia 
2012 Second Place Award, City of North Charleston Outdoor Sculpture Exhibition & Competition,
2009 Honorable Mention Award, City of North Charleston Outdoor Sculpture Exhibition Competition, North Charleston, South Carolina
2008 Sculptural Architectural Installation at the Martin Luther King Natatorium
2007 Artist In Residence in Vermont Studio Center
2006 Artist In Residence in Hungarian Multicultural Center
2005 Sculptural Architectural Installation at Temple Sinai, Atlanta
2004 Scottish Sculpture Workshop
2003 Sculptural Architectural Installation at the Atlanta Botanical Gardens
2003 "Best in Show" from Annette Cone Skeleton at Museum of Contemporary Art Georgia
2003 "Silver Award" from Icarus International
2002 "Silver Sculpture Award" from National Ornamental Miscellaneous Metals Associations
2002 Artist In Residence in Hambidge, Georgia
2001 Artist Blacksmith Association of North America Grant to France & Germany
1996 Artist In Residence in Penland School of Craft, North Carolina

Solo/ duo exhibitions 

 2019 Alchemical Divide, Madison-Morgan Cultural Center, Madison, Georgia
 2019 Blood of the Earth, Sinclair Gallery, ArtsXChange, East Point, Georgia
 2019 Between the Deep Blue Sea and the Universe, Mason Fine Arts, Atlanta, Georgia
 2017 On Waters of Time, Callanwolde Fine Arts Gallery, Atlanta, Georgia 
 2017 Voyages Unforeseen, Kibbee Gallery, Atlanta, Georgia (Duo)
 2015 Emergence from the Waters, Gallery 72, Mayor’s Office of Cultural Affairs, Atlanta, Georgia
 2014 Nautical Observations, Art Partners, High Museum of Art, Atlanta, Georgia
 2013 Soaring on the Surface of the Waters, Norcross Cultural Arts Center, Norcross, Georgia
 2012 Flowing as Water, Rodriguez Room, Goat Farm Arts Center, Atlanta, Georgia
 2008 Rescue Vehicles and Souls of the South, House of Colors, Atlanta, Georgia

Group exhibitions

2019 Flicker, South River Art Studios, Atlanta, Georgia
2019 Ensemble, Spalding Nix Fine Art, Atlanta, Georgia
2019 Losing Control: Guns, Government, and Group-Think, ATHICA: Athens Institute for Contemporary Art, Athens, Georgia, (Curator Arlette Hernandez)
2019 America Is…, National Juried Show, Touchstone Gallery, Washington, D.C.
2019 Sculpture on the Lawn, Outdoor Sculpture Exhibition, Aviation Community Cultural Center, Atlanta, Georgia
2019 Fine Arts Exhibition, Decatur Arts Alliance, The Dalton Gallery, Decatur, Georgia 
2019 ArtFields, Exhibition and Competition, Lakeshore, South Carolina 
2018 Women of Fire, Switzer Gallery, Pensacola State College, Pensacola, Florida 
2018 Members Exhibition, Mid-South Sculpture Alliance, The Emporium Gallery, Knoxville, Tennessee 
2018 Georgia Juried Arts Exhibition, Abernathy Arts Center, Atlanta, Georgia 
2017 Metro Montage XV Show, Marietta Cobb Museum of Art, Marietta, Georgia 
2015 North Charleston National Outdoor Sculpture Competition & Exhibition, North Charleston, South Carolina
2014 SPRING, Terminus Gallery, Atlanta, Georgia 
2014 Metal Extinction: Using Metal to Honor and Make Permanent our Vanishing World, Saddleback College Gallery, Mission Viejo, California 
2013 Coast to Coast by Post, Visual Arts Gallery, Department of Art, University of Wyoming, Laramie, Wyoming 
2012 From The Fields, Il, Chiostro, Painting in Italy, Garda, Italy 
2012 On the Land, Mid-South Sculpture Alliance, Outdoor Sculpture Exhibition, Chattanooga, Tennessee 
2011 ELEVATE, Downtown Revitalizing Sculpture Exhibition, Atlanta, Georgia 
2010 Recurrence, Art on the BeltLine, Atlanta, Georgia
2010 - Icarus International Kinetic Sculpture
2009 Abundance, DUMBO, Public Art Exhibition, Brooklyn, New York (Collaborative)
2009 - City of North Charleston Outdoor Sculpture
2009 The FriendSHIP Project, MOCA GA Project Space, Atlanta, Georgia (Collaborative)
2009 Movers and Shakers, MOCA GA, Atlanta, Georgia 
2008 Entr'acte, Bush Contemporary Arts, Prospect 1, New Orleans, Louisiana 
2008 Le Flash, Light, Performance, and Video, Castleberry Hill, Atlanta, Georgia 
2008 Biennial, Madison-Morgan Cultural Center, Madison, Georgia (Juror: Sylvie Fortin) 
2007 Sculptureyedrum, The Sequel to Breadth, Eyedrum, Atlanta, Georgia 
2006 Ten Year Retrospective, Hungarian Multicultural Center, Eu Gallery, Budapest, Hungary 
2006 Southeastern Juried Exhibition, Mobile Museum of Art, Mobile, Alabama 
2006 The Bridge Show, The B Complex, Atlanta, Georgia

References

1971 births
Living people
Artists from New Hampshire
People from Alstead, New Hampshire
Georgia State University alumni